Trumpet Kings at Montreux '75 is a 1975 live album featuring the jazz trumpeters Roy Eldridge, Dizzy Gillespie and Clark Terry recorded at the 1975 Montreux Jazz Festival. The rhythm section is led by Oscar Peterson.

Track listing
"Montreux Blues" (Louis Bellson, Roy Eldridge, Dizzy Gillespie) – 13:25
"There Is No Greater Love" (Isham Jones, Marty Symes) – 13:25
"Lullaby of the Leaves" (Bernice Petkere, Joe Young) – 11:29
"On the Alamo" (Jones, Gus Kahn) – 11:36
"Blues for Norman" (Bellson, Eldridge, Gillespie) – 8:00
"(Back Home Again In) Indiana" (James F. Hanley, Ballard MacDonald) – 9:03

Personnel
Performance
 Roy Eldridge - trumpet
 Dizzy Gillespie
 Clark Terry
 Oscar Peterson - piano
 Niels-Henning Ørsted Pedersen - double bass
 Louie Bellson - drums
Production
 Norman Granz - producer
Paul Beattie - engineer
John Timperley
Benny Green - liner notes
Phil DeLancie - mastering
Phil Stern - photography
David Luke - remixing
Eric Miller

References 

Albums recorded at the Montreux Jazz Festival
Dizzy Gillespie live albums
Albums produced by Norman Granz
1975 live albums
Roy Eldridge live albums
Clark Terry live albums
Pablo Records live albums